Clos may refer to:

People
 Clos (surname)

Other uses
 CLOS, Command line-of-sight, a method of guiding a missile to its intended target
 Clos network, a kind of multistage switching network
 Clos (vineyard), a walled vineyard; used in France, Germany and California
 an alternative spelling of close in the name of a Cul-de-sac
 Common Lisp Object System (CLOS)